The Egyptian Armed Forces are the military forces of the Arab Republic of Egypt. They consist of the Egyptian Army, Egyptian Navy, Egyptian Air Force and Egyptian Air Defense Forces.

The President of the Republic serves as the Supreme Commander of the Armed Forces. The Minister of Defence and Commander-in-Chief of the Armed Forces, the senior uniformed officer, is Colonel General Mohamed Zaki (since June 2018), and the Chief of Staff is Lieutenant General Osama Askar (since October 2021).

Senior members of the military can convene the Supreme Council of the Armed Forces, such as during the course of the Egyptian Revolution of 2011, when President Mubarak resigned and transferred power to this body on February 11, 2011.

The armament of the Egyptian armed forces varies between eastern and western sources through weapons deliveries by several countries, led by the United States, Russia, France, China, Italy, Ukraine and Britain. Many of the equipment is manufactured locally at Egyptian factories. The Egyptian armed forces celebrate their anniversary on October 6 each year to commemorate the Crossing of the Suez during the October War of 1973.

The modern Egyptian armed forces have been involved in numerous crises and wars since independence, from the 1948 Arab–Israeli War, Egyptian Revolution of 1952, Suez Crisis, North Yemen Civil War, Six-Day War, Nigerian Civil War, War of Attrition, Yom Kippur War, Egyptian bread riots, 1986 Egyptian conscripts riot, Egyptian-Libyan War, Gulf War, War on Terror, Egyptian Crisis, Second Libyan Civil War, War on ISIL and the Sinai insurgency.

History
In the early 1950s, politics rather than military competence was the main criterion for promotion. The Egyptian commander, Field Marshal Abdel Hakim Amer, was a purely political appointee who owed his position to his close friendship with Nasser. He would prove himself grossly incompetent as a general during the Suez Crisis. Rigid lines between officers and men in the Egyptian Army led to a mutual "mistrust and contempt" between officers and the men who served under them. Tsouras writes that the Israelis "seized and held the ..initiative throughout the campaign and quickly destroyed the Egyptian defences." In a few instances, such as at the Mitla Pass and Abu Agelia, Egyptian defences were well-organised and stubbornly held, but this did not make enough difference overall. Nasser ordered a retreat from the Sinai which allowed the Israelis to wreak havoc and drive on the Canal; on 5 November, British and French parachute landings began in the Canal Zone but by 7 November, U.S. pressure had forced an end to the fighting.

Within three months of sending troops to Yemen in 1962, Nasser realized that the engagement would require a larger commitment than anticipated. By early 1963, he would begin a four-year campaign to extricate Egyptian forces from Yemen, using an unsuccessful face-saving mechanism, only to find himself committing more troops. A little less than 5,000 troops were sent in October 1962. Two months later, Egypt had 15,000 regular troops deployed. By late 1963, the number was increased to 36,000; and in late 1964, the number rose to 50,000 Egyptian troops in Yemen. Late 1965 represented the high-water mark of Egyptian troop commitment in Yemen at 55,000 troops, which were broken into 13 infantry regiments of one artillery division, one tank division from the Egyptian Armoured Corps and several Special Forces as well as airborne regiments. All the Egyptian field commanders complained of a total lack of topographical maps causing a real problem in the first months of the war.

Before the June 1967 War, the army divided its personnel into four regional commands (Suez, Sinai, Nile Delta, and Nile Valley up to the Sudan). The remainder of Egypt's territory, over 75%, was the sole responsibility of the Frontier Corps.

In May 1967, President Nasser closed the Straits of Tiran to passage of Israeli ships. Israel considered the closure of the straits grounds for war and prepared their armed forces to attack. On June 3, three battalions of Egyptian commandos were flown to Amman to take part in operations from Jordan. But U.S. historian Trevor N. Dupuy, writing in 1978, argues from King Hussein of Jordan's memoirs, My "War" with Israel, that Nasser did not intend to start an immediate war, but instead was happy with his rhetorical and political accomplishments of the past weeks. Nevertheless, Israel felt it needed to take action.

The Egyptian army, comprising two armored and five infantry divisions, were deployed in the Sinai. In the weeks before the Six-Day War began, Egypt made several significant changes to its military organisation; Field Marshal Amer created a new command interposed between the general staff and the Eastern Military District commander, Lieutenant General Salah ad-Din Muhsin. This new Sinai Front Command was placed under General Abdel Mohsin Murtagi, who had returned from Yemen in May 1967. Six of the seven divisions in the Sinai (with the exception of the 20th Infantry 'Palestinian' Division) had their commanders and chiefs of staff replaced. What fragmentary information is available suggests to authors such as Pollack that Amer was trying to improve the competence of the force, replacing political appointees with veterans of the Yemen war.

After the war began on 5 June 1967, Israel attacked Egypt, destroyed its air force on the ground, and occupied the Sinai Peninsula. The forward deployed Egyptian forces were shattered in three places by the attacking Israelis. Field Marshal Amer, overwhelmed by events, and ignoring previous plans, ordered a retreat by the Egyptian Army to the Suez Canal. This developed into a rout as the Israelis harried the retreating troops from the ground and from the air.

In July 1972, President Anwar Sadat expelled Soviet Armed Forces advisors from Egypt. The Soviet advisors had significant access and influence previously. When the Yom Kippur War began in October 1973, the Egyptians were initially successful in crossing the Suez Canal and establishing a bridgehead on the eastern bank. In the costly and brutal Battle of the Chinese Farm, the Israeli Defence Force shouldered aside portions of the Second Army on the eastern bank, then crossed the canal and rapidly advanced, destroying surface-to-air missile sites and then cutting off the Third Army. The Egyptians did stop the Israelis seizing Ismailia, however, and inflicted a "stunning defeat" on an Israeli force which had tried to hastily seize Suez City in the Battle of Suez. Peace was only imposed after the United States and Soviet Union stepped in.

When Sadat and the Israelis made peace in the Camp David Accords of September 1978, part of the quid pro quo for the Egyptians accepting peace was that the  U.S. would provide substantial military assistance to Egypt. Today the U.S. provides annual military assistance often quoted at some nominal $1.3 billion to the Egyptian armed forces ($ billion in ). This level is second only to Israel.

Scholars such as Kenneth Pollack, DeAtkine, and Robert Springborg have identified a number of reasons why Arab (and Egyptian) armies performed so poorly against Israel from 1948 to the 1970s and afterwards; In battle against Israel from 1948, junior officers consistently demonstrated an unwillingness to manoeuvre, innovate, improvise, take initiative, or act independently. Ground forces units suffered from constant manipulation of information and an inattention to intelligence gathering and objective analysis. Units from the two divisions dispatched to Saudi Arabia in 1990–91, accompanied by U.S. personnel during the 1991 Gulf War, consistently reported fierce battles even though they actually encountered little or no resistance. This occurred whether or not they were accompanied by U.S. military personnel or journalists. Later researchers such as Springborg have confirmed that the tendencies identified in the 1980s and 1990s persist in the Armed Forces in the twenty-first century.

Egypt is a participant in NATO's Mediterranean Dialogue forum.

Twenty-first century 

In the second decade of the 21st century, the Armed Forces enjoy considerable power and independence within the Egyptian state. They are also influential in business, engaging in road and housing construction, consumer goods, resort management, and own vast tracts of real estate. A significant amount of military information is not made publicly available, including budget information, the names of the general officers and the military's size (which is considered a state secret). According to journalist Joshua Hammer, "as much as 40% of the Egyptian economy" is controlled by the Egyptian armed forces, and other authoritative works such as Springborg reinforce this trend.

On 31 January 2011, during the Egyptian revolution of 2011, Israeli media reported that the 9th, 2nd, and 7th Divisions of the Army had been ordered into Cairo to help restore order.

On 3 July 2013, the Egyptian Armed Forces launched a coup d'état against the elected government of Mohamed Morsi following mass protests demanding his resignation. On 8 July 2013, clashes between the Republican Guard and pro-Morsi supporters left 61 protestors killed. On 14 August 2013, the Egyptian Army along with the police carried out the Rabaa massacre, killing 2,600 people. The total casualty count made 14 August the deadliest day in Egypt since the Egyptian revolution of 2011 which had toppled former President Hosni Mubarak. Several world leaders denounced the violence during the sit-in dispersals.

In 2018 there were no evident internal cracks within the Armed Forces. The Egyptian Armed Forces’ unrivalled dominance, both in politics and within the security apparatus, appear to be the result of three combined factors: substantial economic interests, a long-time legitimacy buttressed by the army's active involvement in welfare and development initiatives, and the reliance on universal conscription as the main avenue for the successful accommodation of class and social cleavages.

On March 25, 2020, it was reported that two army generals, Shafea Dawoud and Khaled Shaltout, had died from the COVID-19 pandemic in Egypt, and at least 550 officers and soldiers had been infected with the virus.

In March 2021, Human Rights Watch accused the EAF of violating international human rights law and committing war crimes by demolishing more than 12,300 residential and commercial buildings and 6,000 hectares of farmland since 2013 in North Sinai.

Structure 
The Supreme Commander-in-Chief is the President of Egypt, currently Abdel Fattah el-Sisi. All branches, forces, armies, regions, bodies, organs and departments of the Armed Forces are under the command of the Commander-in-Chief of the Armed Forces, who is at the same time the Ministry of Defence and Military Production.

The Supreme Council of the Armed Forces (SCAF) is composed of 23 members, chaired by the Commander-in-Chief and Minister of Defence, and is represented by the Chief of Staff of the Armed Forces. Commanders of military areas (central, northern, western, southern), heads of bodies (operations, armament, logistics, engineering, training, finance, military justice, Armed Forces Management and Administration), directors of many departments (officers and Military Intelligence and Reconnaissance), and assistant secretary of defence for constitutional and legal affairs. The Secretary of the Board is the Secretary General of the Ministry of Defence.

Army

Conscripts for the Egyptian Army and other service branches without a university degree serve three years as enlisted soldiers. Conscripts with a General Secondary School Degree serve two years as enlisted personnel. Conscripts with a university degree serve one year as enlisted personnel or three years as a reserve officer. Officers for the army are trained at the Egyptian Military Academy. The IISS estimated in 2020 that the Army numbered 90–120,000, with 190–220,000 conscripts, a total of 310,000.

Air Force

The Egyptian Air Force (EAF) is the aviation branch of the Egyptian Armed Forces. Currently, the backbone of the EAF is the General Dynamics F-16 Fighting Falcon. The Mirage 2000 is the other modern interceptor used by the EAF. The Egyptian Air Force has 216 F-16s (plus 20 on order). It has about 579 combat aircraft and 149 armed helicopters as it continues to fly extensively upgraded MiG-21s, F-7 Skybolts, F-4 Phantoms, Dassault Mirage Vs, and the C-130 Hercules among other planes.
Egypt currently operates 24 Dassault Rafale, a French twin-engine fighter aircraft as of 2019.

Air Defense Forces
The Egyptian Air Defense Forces or ADF (Quwwat El Diffaa El Gawwi in Arabic) is Egypt's military service responsible for air defense. Egypt patterned its force after the Soviet Air Defence Force, which integrated all its air defence capabilities – antiaircraft guns, rocket and missile units, interceptor planes, and radar and warning installations. It appears to comprise five subordinate divisions, 110 surface-to-air missile battalions, and 12 anti-aircraft artillery brigades. Personnel quality may be 'several notches below' that of the Air Force personnel. The IISS estimated in 2020 that personnel numbered 80,000 active and 70,000 reserve.

Its commander is Lieutenant General Aly Fahmy Mohammed Aly Fahmi.

Navy

The Egyptian Navy existed thousands of years ago, specifically during the Early Dynastic period in 2800 BC.

During the early modern era, in 1805, Muhammad Ali of Egypt became the Wali of the country forming his own autonomous rule over Egypt. To build the empire he always wished, he needed a strong military and so he managed to prepare that military starting with the army then the Navy. During his reign, the Navy already existed but it was only used for troop transportation. Its first engagement was during the Wahhabi War where it was used to transport troops from Egypt to Yanbu in Hejaz. Later in 1815, Muhammad Ali built Alexandria Shipyard to build warships not just transport ships. The Navy then participated in the Greek War of Independence where in 1827 it had over 100 warships and hundreds of transport ships. After the Second World War, some fleet units were stationed in the Red Sea, but the bulk of the force remained in the Mediterranean. Navy headquarters and the main operational and training base are located at Ras el Tin near Alexandria.

The Navy also controls the Egyptian Coast Guard. The Coast Guard is responsible for the onshore protection of public installations near the coast and the patrol of coastal waters to prevent smuggling. The IISS Military Balance 2017 listed the Coast Guard with 2,000 personnel, 14 fast patrol boats (PBF) and 65 patrol boats (including 15 Swiftships, 21 Timsah, three Type-89 and nine Peterson-class.

Other agencies 
The Armed Forces Medical Service Department provides many military health services. The Armed Forces College of Medicine in Heliopolis, Cairo, provides medical training. As of February 2020, the AFCM commandant was Maj. Gen. Dr. Amr Hegab.

Egypt also maintains 397,000 paramilitary troops. The Central Security Forces comes under the control of the Ministry of Interior. As of 2017, the Egyptian Border Guard Corps falls under the control of the Ministry of Interior as well. Circa 2020, according to the IISS Military Balance 2020, they comprised an estimated 12,000, in 18 border regiments, with light weapons only (IISS 2020, p. 375). However, that listing of numbers has remained the same at least since the 2017 edition (p375).

Military equipment and industry 

The inventory of the Egyptian armed forces includes equipment from the United States, France, Brazil, the United Kingdom, the Soviet Union, and the People's Republic of China. This wide range of sources can cause serviceability difficulties. Equipment from the Soviet Union is being progressively replaced by more modern U.S., French, and British equipment, a significant portion of which is built under license in Egypt, such as the M1A1 Abrams tank.

Egypt is one of the few countries in the Middle East, and the only Arab state, with a reconnaissance satellite and has launched another one,  EgyptSat 1 in 2007.

The Arab Organization for Industrialization supervises nine military factories which produce civilian goods as well as military products. Initially, the owners of AOI were the governments of Egypt, Saudi Arabia, and the United Arab Emirates, before the latter governments gave their shares back to Egypt in 1993, valued at $1.8 billion. AOI is now entirely owned by the government of Egypt and has about 19,000 employees out of which 1250 are engineers. AOI fully owns ten factories and shares in two joint ventures, plus the Arab Institute for Advanced Technology.

Military schools

There is an undergraduate military school for each branch of the Egyptian Armed Forces, and they include:
 Commanders and Staff College
 Reserve Officer College, supervised by General Gamal Elsabrouty.
 Nasser Higher Military Academy
 Egyptian Military Academy
 Egyptian Air Academy
 Egyptian Naval Academy
 Egyptian Air Defence Academy
 Egyptian Military Technical College
 Armed Forces Technical Institute
 Armed Forces Institute for NCOs
 Egyptian GIS counter strike school, supervised by Lieutenant-Colonel Elhamy A. Elsebaey
 Armed Forces Institute for Nursery
 Thunderbolt School
 Airborne School (Egypt)

See also
 Flags of the Egyptian Armed Forces

References

 
  
 
  See also book reviewed in International Security, Vol. 28, No.2.

Further reading
 Norvell deAtkine, 'Why Arabs Lose Wars,' Middle East Quarterly, 6(4).
 CMI Publications, "The Egyptian military in politics and the economy: Recent history and current transition status". www.cmi.no. Retrieved 2016-01-21.
 Maj Gen Mohammed Fawzy, The Three-Years War (in Arabic)
 Ferris, Jesse, Egypt, the Cold War, and the Civil War in Yemen, 1962–1966, Princeton University. ProQuest Dissertations Publishing, 2008. 3332407.
 H.Frisch, Guns and butter in the Egyptian Army, p. 6. Middle East Review of International Affairs, Vol. 5, No. 2 (Summer 2001).
 
 Dr Mohammed al-Jawadi, In Between the Catastrophe: Memoirs of Egyptian Military Commanders from 1967 to 1972 (in Arabic)
 Hazem Kandil, 'Soldiers, Spies, and Statesmen: Egypt's Road to Revolt,' Verso, 2012
 Maj Gen Abed al-Menahim Khalil, Egyptian Wars in Modern History (in Arabic)
 Andrew McGregor, A military history of modern Egypt: from the Ottoman Conquest to the Ramadan War, Greenwood Publishing Group, 2006
 "The Egyptian Armed Forces and the Remaking of an Economic Empire". Carnegie Middle East Center. Retrieved 2016-01-21.
 Lt Gen Saad el-Shazly, The Crossing of the Suez
 Witty, David M. "A regular Army in counterinsurgency operations: Egypt in North Yemen, 1962-1967." The Journal of Military History 65, no. 2 (2001).

External links
 Egyptian Armed Forces
 CIA World Factbook
 FAS
 GlobalSecurity
 Department of State, Academics see the military in decline, but retaining strong influence, 23 September 2009 (US Embassy Cables, The Guardian, 2011)
 Egypt’s Supreme Council of the Armed Forces, The New York Times, February 10, 2011
 Egypt's military leadership, Aljazeera English, February 11, 2011

 

he:צבא מצרים